Jim van Fessem (born 7 August 1975) is a Dutch former professional footballer who played as a goalkeeper.

Club career
Van Fessem was born in Tilburg. He played for Willem II, Vitesse Arnhem, ADO Den Haag, De Graafschap and NAC in the Eredivisie.

International career
He represented the Netherlands at the 1995 FIFA World Youth Championship and earned 17 caps for the Netherlands U21 national team.

Career statistics

References

1975 births
Living people
Dutch footballers
Footballers from Tilburg
Association football goalkeepers
Netherlands under-21 international footballers
Eredivisie players
Eerste Divisie players
Willem II (football club) players
SBV Vitesse players
ADO Den Haag players
De Graafschap players
NAC Breda players